Route 360 is a provincial highway located in the Capitale-Nationale region in the south central part of the province of Quebec. The highway runs from Quebec City's Beauport sector and ends at the junction of Route 138 northeast of Saint-Tite-des-Caps in the Charlevoix region. For a large portion of its length it runs right beside Route 138, overlapping it briefly near Beaupré. The road also travels through significant portions of the Charlevoix touristic area and also crosses Mont-Sainte-Anne ski resort and the Montmorency Falls located at the Montmorency River which connects the Saint Lawrence River nearby.

Towns along Route 360

 Quebec City (including the Beauport sector)
 Boischatel
 L'Ange-Gardien
 Château-Richer
 Sainte-Anne-de-Beaupré
 Beaupré
 Saint-Férréol-des-Neiges
 Saint-Tite-des-Caps

See also
 List of Quebec provincial highways

References

External links 
 Official Transports Quebec Map 
 Route 360 on Google Maps

360
Roads in Capitale-Nationale
Streets in Quebec City